Fehmi Mert Günok (born 1 March 1989) is a Turkish footballer who plays as a goalkeeper for Beşiktaş.

Günok started his career with a short spell in Kocaelispor and joined Fenerbahçe in 2001, where he stayed until 2015, where he was promoted to professional status, played at Süper Lig level, and won 2 Süper Lig titles. He joined Bursaspor in 2015 where he stayed 2 seasons. In 2017, Günok signed for Başakşehir F.K. where he attained his first Süper Lig title of 2019–20 season.

Günok represent Turkey at international competitions to date, starting from U16 level in 2004. He earned his first senior international cap in 2012. He was the first-choice goalkeeper of the national team during Euro 2020 qualifying stage in which they qualified for the finals.

During his professional career, Günok won 3 Süper Lig, 2 Turkish Cup and 3 Turkish Super Cup titles during his spells at Fenerbahçe and Istanbul Başakşehir.

Club career

Fenerbahçe
Günok started his football career with a short spell at youth level football at Kocaelispor between 2000 and 2001, which he described as "playing in couple of games while my father was working there", while Mahir, his father was employed as goalkeeping coach. Then, he was discovered by Fenerbahçe officials in 2001, in Istanbul, during a small field game and, joined the team where his first football license was issued. During his youth level career, he scored a goal from a penalty kick against Manisaspor in a PAF Ligi game, ended 2–0, taken place on 9 March 2008,.

Günok signed his first professional contract before 2009–10 season. He was the third-choice goalkeeper, behind Volkan Demirel and Volkan Babacan of Fenerbahçe at 2010–11 season.

He made his Süper Lig debut against Antalyaspor on 15 August 2010, coming on as a substitute after Volkan Demirel got injured at the beginning of the second half, earning a clean sheet. Günok maintained his place in starting line-up in the following two Süper Lig encounters, respectively against  Trabzonspor and Manisaspor, where he conceded 5 goals in total. During the home game against Trabzonspor, ended 2–3, Günok saved the penalty shot of Argentine midfielder Gustavo Colman.

He was given a chance in starting line-up at mid-season exhibition match against Belgian side K.R.C. Genk, on 9 January 2013. Due to Volkan Demirel's penal absence, Günok was featured in starting line-up of 2013 Turkish Super Cup against Galatasaray S.K. and chosen "man of the match", although Fenerbahçe lost by 0–1 final score after extra time.

In 2014–15 season, Günok played three back-to-back Süper Lig games in September, respectively against Karabükspor, Trabzonspor and Gaziantepspor, and he saved 8 out of 10 attempts made by opponents in these encounters, during Volkan Demirel's penal absence. After 14 years spent at the club, Günok, at the age of 26, was released by Fenerbahçe, on 15 June 2015. During his last season, he played in 9 Süper Lig and 9 Turkish Cup encounters, conceded 19 goals in total.

Bursaspor
After being released by Fenerbahçe at the end of 2014–15 season, Günok joined Bursaspor, on a 3-season-long contract, on 22 June 2015. His contract was of €1.2 million salary per annum. Chosen as first-choice goalkeeper in the first half of the 2015–16 season, Günok was replaced by Harun Tekin from February on by decision of manager Hamza Hamzaoğlu, as he conceded 32 goals in 19 league games. In his second season at Bursaspor, he was deployed only in Turkish Cup encounters. At the end of season, his contract was cancelled in return of his outstanding wages from Bursaspor.

Başakşehir
On 31 July 2017, Günok joined İstanbul Başakşehir F.K. In his first season at Başakşehir, he was the second goalkeeper behind Volkan Babacan, his former teammate from Fenerbahçe, and deployed only at Turkish Cup games and UEFA Europa League. He made his debut at Başakşehir on 30 November 2017, against Kahramanmaraşspor, at the fifth round game of Turkish Cup. Putting an improved individual display in pre-season trainings, he was given the starting line-up status by team manager Abdullah Avcı from 2018–19 season on. His first Süper Lig game with Başakşehir was against Trabzonspor, ended 2–0 for Başakşehir, at Fatih Terim Stadium, on 12 August 2018.

Günok saved a penalty against Konyaspor on week 7 encounter of 2020–21 season, eventually ended 2–1 for Başakşehir's favour, on 1 November 2020. He missed 5 league games and was replaced by Volkan Babacan in December at 2020–21 season due to COVID-19 quarantine. Played as starter, he lost the 2020 Turkish Super Cup up against Trabzonspor, played on a postponed schedule due to COVID-19 pandemic, ended 1–2, on 27 January 2021. Günok was released by club on 15 August 2021 in return of outstanding receivables of Günok.

Beşiktaş
Günok joined Beşiktaş J.K with a 3 year-long contract, as the 7th transfer of the club during the transfer window, on 15 August 2021.

International career

Substitited in 62nd minute following the injury of starter Cenk Gönen, Günok earned his first senior cap during a friendly game against Georgia on 25 May 2012, ended 3–1 for Turkey, held at Red Bull Arena, Salzburg, Austria.

On 8 June 2019, he earned a clean sheet against defending World Champions France after a 2–0 score at Group H encounter during UEFA Euro 2020 qualifying stage. Conceding 3 goals in 10 games, Günok was the main choice goalkeeper of Turkey, which put their best defensive performance ever at qualifying phases of UEFA European Championship, under management of Şenol Güneş. He was called-up for the extended 30-men-squad ahead of UEFA Euro 2020 by Şenol Güneş, announced on 14 May 2021.

Personal life
Mert Günok was born in 1989 in Karabük, Turkey, while his father Mahir Günok was playing at Karabükspor. His mother Necmiye passed away in 2011, following an undisclosed disease.

Günok married with Aslı Günok (née: Dalgalıdere) in Bursa, in 2015. The couple welcomed their first child, named Alâ, in 2019. In 2020, he donated 100 pairs of goalkeeper gloves to 100 schools across Turkey.

Career statistics

Club

1.Includes Turkish Cup.
2.Includes UEFA Champions League and UEFA Cup/Europa League.
3.Includes Turkish Super Cup.

International

Honours
Fenerbahçe
 Süper Lig (2): 2010–11, 2013–14 
 Turkish Cup (2): 2011–12, 2012–13
 Turkish Super Cup (2): 2009, 2014

İstanbul Başakşehir
Süper Lig (1): 2019–20

Beşiktaş
Turkish Super Cup (1): 2021

Individual
Süper Lig Goalkeeper of the Year: 2018–19

References

External links

 
 
 
 

1989 births
Living people
People from Karabük
Turkish footballers
Turkey international footballers
Turkey under-21 international footballers
Turkey youth international footballers
Fenerbahçe S.K. footballers
Bursaspor footballers
İstanbul Başakşehir F.K. players
Beşiktaş J.K. footballers
Süper Lig players
Association football goalkeepers
Turkey B international footballers
UEFA Euro 2020 players